Steve David (born 11 March 1951 in Point Fortin, Trinidad) is a Trinidadian former North American Soccer League and international football player.

Club career
David began his professional career with Police in Trinidad and Tobago. In 1974, he signed with the Miami Toros in the North American Soccer League. That season, the Toros had reached the finals, losing the championship games to Los Angeles 4–3. David had a standout second season and was named the 1975 NASL MVP as the Toros reached the league cup play-off semi-final stage. After a poor 1976 season, scoring only one goal in thirteen games, the Toros traded him to the Los Angeles Aztecs. He had a rebound in form, scoring twenty-six goals in twenty-four games. However, he began expressing dissatisfaction with the Aztecs at the beginning of the 1977 season. After a 1–2 start, the Aztecs sent David to the Detroit Express in exchange for a 1979 first-round draft pick and cash on 22 April 1978. He played eleven games with the Express before they sent him to the California Surf. He finished the 1978 season, then played the entire 1979 season, in California. In 1980, he began the season with the San Diego Sockers before they sent him to the San Jose Earthquakes. He remained with the Earthquakes through the 1981 season after which he left the NASL. He finished his NASL career as the league's 8th all-time leading scorer with 228 points in 175 games, including a 7th best tally of 100 goals. In the fall of 1981, he signed with the Phoenix Inferno of the Major Indoor Soccer League. He finished the 1981–82 season the league's 4th best scorer with 81 points in 44 games and the 1982–83 season 9th best with 81 points in 47 games.

International career
David scored 16 goals in World Cup qualifiers for T&T between 1972 and 1976. He was inducted into the Trinidad and Tobago Football Hall of Fame in 2008.

Career statistics

International goals

References

Sources
Trinidad Express article
NASL homepage

NASL/MISL stats

1951 births
Living people
California Surf players
Detroit Express players
Los Angeles Aztecs players
Major Indoor Soccer League (1978–1992) players
Miami Toros players
North American Soccer League (1968–1984) players
North American Soccer League (1968–1984) indoor players
Phoenix Inferno players
San Diego Sockers (NASL) players
San Jose Earthquakes (1974–1988) players
San Luis F.C. players
Liga MX players
Expatriate footballers in Mexico
Trinidad and Tobago expatriate sportspeople in Mexico
Expatriate soccer players in the United States
Trinidad and Tobago expatriate sportspeople in the United States
Trinidad and Tobago footballers
Trinidad and Tobago expatriate footballers
Trinidad and Tobago international footballers
Place of birth missing (living people)
Association football forwards